The 1984 BYU Cougars football team represented Brigham Young University (BYU) in the 1984 NCAA Division I-A football season. The Cougars were led by 13th-year head coach LaVell Edwards and played their home games at Cougar Stadium in Provo, Utah. The team competed as a member of the Western Athletic Conference, winning the conference for the ninth consecutive year. The Cougars finished the regular season as the only undefeated team in Division I-A, and secured their first ever national title by defeating Michigan in the 1984 Holiday Bowl.

A number of pollsters and coaches were reluctant to name the Cougars as national champion, partly because they believed BYU's schedule was too weak. Only two of BYU's opponents won at least seven games. They had played only one ranked opponent all season, preseason #3 Pittsburgh, a team that would finish 3–7–1 and unranked. No other team in the WAC was even close to being their equal; the Cougars were the only team in the league with fewer than four overall losses. In the end, BYU was ranked number one in both major final polls, the AP Poll and the Coaches Poll. The team was named national champion by NCAA-designated major selectors of AP, Billingsley, Football Research, FW, National Football Foundation, Poling,  UPI, and USA/CNN, while named co-champion by both National Championship Foundation and Sagarin (ELO-Chess).

To date, the 1984 Cougars are the last team from outside a "power conference" to win a national title. It is widely believed that the various systems devised over the years with a view toward deciding the national championship on the field, with their emphasis on strength of schedule, make it extremely difficult for a team outside the power conferences to be considered for championship contention.

Schedule

Personnel

Rankings

Results

at No. 3 Pittsburgh

Baylor

Robbie Bosco 28-43, 363 yards, 6 TD

Tulsa

at Hawaii

    
    
    
    
    
    
    

Glen Kozlowski 9 Rec, 156 Yds

at Colorado State

Wyoming

Robbie Bosco 29-44, 384 yards, 5 TD
David Mills 7 receptions, 136 yards, 3 TD

at Air Force

    
    
    
    
    
    
    
    
    
    

Robbie Bosco 28-41, 484 yards, 4 TD, INT

at New Mexico

UTEP

San Diego State

at Utah

Utah State

vs. Michigan (Holiday Bowl)

Source: CougarStats.com

Draft picks
The following were selected in the 1985 NFL Draft.

Awards and honors
 Robbie Bosco, Sammy Baugh Trophy

References

BYU
BYU Cougars football seasons
College football national champions
Western Athletic Conference football champion seasons
Holiday Bowl champion seasons
College football undefeated seasons
BYU Cougars football